The following are the national records in athletics in Iceland maintained by its national athletics federation: Frjálsíþróttasamband Íslands (FRI).

Outdoor

Key to tables:

+ = en route to a longer distance

h = hand timing

Mx = mixed race

OT = oversized track (> 200m in circumference)

Men

Women

Indoor

Men

Women

Notes

References
General
Icelandic Athletics Records  16 September 2020 updated
Specific

External links
 FRI web site

Iceland
Records
Athletics
Athletics